Tapan Sharma (born 24 May 1975) is an Indian cricket umpire. He has stood in matches in the Ranji Trophy tournament.
He stood as an onfield umpire in the 2021 Indian Premier League, for the first time, in a group match between Chennai Super Kings and Kolkata Knight Riders.

References

External links
 

1975 births
Living people
Indian cricket umpires
Cricketers from Rajasthan